Worcester is a town in Mopani District Municipality in the Limpopo province of South Africa.

Famous people born in Worcester include round-the-world yachtsman Jean-Jacques Provoyeur.

References

Populated places in the Maruleng Local Municipality